Lea Danilson-Järg (born 27 November 1977) is an Estonian politician. She serves as Minister of Justice in the second cabinet of Prime Minister Kaja Kallas.

References 

Living people
1977 births
Politicians from Tallinn
Government ministers of Estonia
Women government ministers of Estonia
21st-century Estonian politicians
21st-century Estonian women politicians
Isamaa politicians
Tallinn University of Technology alumni